is a Japanese ice hockey player for the DK Peregrine and the Japanese national team. She participated at the 2015 IIHF Women's World Championship.

Yoneyama competed at both the 2014 and the 2018 Winter Olympics.

References

External links

1991 births
Living people
Ice hockey players at the 2014 Winter Olympics
Ice hockey players at the 2018 Winter Olympics
Ice hockey players at the 2022 Winter Olympics
Japanese women's ice hockey forwards
Olympic ice hockey players of Japan
Universiade medalists in ice hockey
Universiade bronze medalists for Japan
Competitors at the 2015 Winter Universiade
Sportspeople from Hokkaido
Asian Games medalists in ice hockey
Ice hockey players at the 2011 Asian Winter Games
Ice hockey players at the 2017 Asian Winter Games
Medalists at the 2011 Asian Winter Games
Medalists at the 2017 Asian Winter Games
Asian Games gold medalists for Japan
Asian Games silver medalists for Japan